Jan te Nijenhuis is a Dutch psychologist. He is a lecturer of psychology at the University of Amsterdam, known for his research on human intelligence. He studied at Groningen University and the Free University of Amsterdam.

References

External links
Faculty page (archive as of 2018-03-08)

Living people
Dutch psychologists
Intelligence researchers
Psychometricians
Race and intelligence controversy
Academic staff of the University of Amsterdam
University of Groningen alumni
Vrije Universiteit Amsterdam alumni
Year of birth missing (living people)